Royon is a commune in the Pas-de-Calais department in the Hauts-de-France region of France.

Geography
Royon is located 10 miles (16 km) east of Montreuil-sur-Mer on the D130 road, in the valley of the Créquoise river.

Population

History
The slopes of hills in the region were blocked by thorny hedges of créquiers, the wild plum, and these hedges were called royons  
The first mention of Royon is in 893 in Gallia Christiana. It is mentioned again in 1641 as 'Roion', and became 'Royon' in 1804.

Places of interest
 The church of St. Germain, dating from the sixteenth century.
 The Louis XV château, destroyed in May 1944.
 The present day château, home of the current mayor.

See also
 Communes of the Pas-de-Calais department

References

Communes of Pas-de-Calais